KWTF (88.1 FM) is a radio station licensed to serve the community of Bodega Bay, California. The station is owned by KWTF Radio, and airs a variety format.

The station was assigned the KWTF call letters by the Federal Communications Commission on September 30, 2010.

References

External links
 Official Website
 

WTF
Radio stations established in 2013
2013 establishments in California
Variety radio stations in the United States
Community radio stations in the United States
Sonoma County, California